The Grassroot Deviation is an Edmonton-based four-piece musical group that plays a mixture of roots, rock and funk. The band formed in 2002 and consists of guitarists/vocalists Brian Parker and Dan Smith, bassist/fiddler Mike Barer and drummer Vinay Jhass. The band has played more than 100 shows across Canada and released two studio albums, The Grassroot Deviation and The Circuit. All the band members have either graduated or currently attend the University of Alberta.

History 
The Grassroot Deviation are influenced by Emmylou Harris, Bruce Cockburn and Neil Young. Their work includes instrumental jam sessions, such as the Celtic infused "Mr. Somebody", mid tempo folk ballads like "Steady Ground" and the funk infused "Regular People", which features 12-bar blues, call and response and funky bass and drums. Front man Brian Parker states, "I think when you combine the writing of folk songs with that dancey, groove-inspired kinda thing, you end up with what we do." The band have played on the same bill as acts such as Keller Williams, That One Guy, Wide Mouth Mason, Wasabi Collective, Slowcoaster, Captain Tractor, Hey Ocean, and Five Alarm Funk.

Defending their liking for instrumentals, Brian Parker said "[Lyrics are] definitely important...Sometimes lyrics are necessary, sometimes they’re not...If you're writing a song and you want to convey a certain emotion or idea...lyrics are one route and music provides another.".

The second album, The Circuit, is more rooted in their jam session style, which maintains the energy and enthusiasm of their live performances. Parker explains, "We went into the studio and banged it out. It was very speedy, but I'm happy with that sound. That was sort of the concept of the album - 'Let's just do what we do.' We get the most response from our shows. The shows are what we do, so why would we try to change that?" During 2007, the band toured Canada, beginning with Victoria, British Columbia and ending in Antigonish, Nova Scotia.

In November 2008, The Grassroot Deviation performed in front of 250 fans at The Digital Universe, a laser light show complemented by Canada's only full dome digital projection system in the Margaret Zeidler Star Theatre at TELUS World of Science, Edmonton. The visuals were coordinated to the band's set which was composed largely of jams.

Discography

Albums
The Grassroot Deviation - 2006
The Circuit - 2007

References

External links
The Grassroot Deviation at The Internet Archive
Official MySpace

Canadian rock music groups